Huron Centre was a federal electoral district in Ontario, Canada, that was represented in the House of Commons of Canada from 1872 to 1882.  This riding was created from parts of Huron North and Huron South ridings.

The Centre riding consisted of the Townships of Colborne, Hullet, McKillop, Tuckersmith, Grey, the Town of Goderich and the village of Seaforth.

The electoral district was abolished in 1882 when it was redistributed between Huron West and Huron South ridings.

Election results

On Mr. Horton's resignation:

See also 

 List of Canadian federal electoral districts
 Past Canadian electoral districts

External links 
Riding history from the Library of Parliament

Former federal electoral districts of Ontario